Sohaemus may refer to:

Sohaemus of Emesa, 1st-century Roman client king
Sohaemus of Armenia, 2nd-century Roman client king